Henning Frandsen (20 August 1922 – 28 November 1973) was a Danish footballer. He played in one match for the Denmark national football team in 1949.

References

External links
 

1922 births
1973 deaths
Danish men's footballers
Denmark international footballers
Place of birth missing
Association footballers not categorized by position